Nuestra Belleza Coahuila 2011, was held at the Teatro Nazas in Torreón, Coahuila on July 15, 2011. At the conclusion of the final night of competition, Diana Ávila of Torreón was crowned the winner. Ávila  was crowned by outgoing Nuestra Belleza Coahuila titleholder, Cecilia Flores. Ten contestants competed for the state title.

Results

Placements

Special awards

Judges
Daniel Morado Acosta - Photographer
Abril Cervera - Designer
Melchor Cadena - Advertising Director
Maricarmen Rodríguez - Image Consultant

Background Music
Sandoval

Contestants

References

External links
Official Website

Nuestra Belleza México